The Bakersfield Ice Sports Center is a year-round, indoor ice rink in Bakersfield, California. The facility was completed in 2003. It contains a regulation size ice hockey rink, and seating for 500. It also contains locker rooms, and a snack bar. It is used for adult, youth, high school, college, and even special needs hockey, ice skating lessons, and open skating. It is the primary home arena to the Bakersfield Jr. Condors formerly the Bakersfield Dragons, Kern County Knights, and Bakersfield Oilers ASHA team. It is also the practice facility and secondary home arena to the Cal State Bakersfield Roadrunners club hockey team also use the facility for tryouts. They play their home games there when Mechanics Bank Arena is hosting other events.  The Bakersfield Condors also used the facility for preseason training and occasional practices until 2016 when they moved their preseason training to Mechanics Bank Arena but still occasionally practice there when Mechanics Bank Arena is hosting other events.

See also
McMurtrey Aquatic Center
Bakersfield Condors (1998–2015)

References

External links

Indoor ice hockey venues in California
Sports venues in Bakersfield, California
2003 establishments in California
Sports venues completed in 2003